Dr. Mona Fayad (Arabic: منى فياض, born in 1950 in South Lebanon) is a francophone Lebanese intellectual, writer, political activist and university professor woman, and is one of the most prominent Shiite opponents of Hezbollah. She is a member of the Lebanese Association of Women Researchers. She is a professor of psychology at the Lebanese University. Fayad strongly condemned the assassination of her colleague and also Shiite Lukman Slim in 2021, holding Hezbollah responsible of telling the Lebanese people the truth of who was behind the crime.

Biography 
She teaches psychology at the Lebanese University in Beirut. She is a member of many scientific and intellectual organizations, and is since 2001 a founding member of the Democratic Renewal Movement headed by Nassib Lahoud, and was the member of committee until 2010, she returned to the committee during the internal elections of 19 July and was since then elected as vice-president. She became known to the public during the 2006 Lebanon-Israeli war between Hezbollah and Israel, throughout numerous articles in which she criticized the blackmail and pressures that the Shiite intellectuals went through from Hezbollah.

Publications 

 The Body in the Trap, Dar Al Rais, Beirut, 2000.
 The Child Schoole’s Education in The Family and Cultural Space, Arab cultural center, Beirut-Rabat, 2004.
 Arab Culturel’s Masques, Dar athakafa, Cairo, 2006.
 To be Lebanese, Dar alarabyah lilouloum, Beirut, 2008.
 How to Deal With Violence That Exists Among Us, Dar Al Nahda, Beirut,  2012.

References 

1950 births
Living people
21st-century Lebanese women writers
Academic staff of Lebanese University
Lebanese women activists
Democratic Renewal (Lebanon) politicians
People from South Lebanon
Francophone people